La Voz (season 1) is a Spanish reality talent show that premiered on 19 September 2012 on Telecinco. Based on the reality singing competition The Voice of Holland, the series was created by Dutch television producer John de Mol. It is part of an international series.

The coaches for the debut season were David Bisbal, Rosario Flores, Malú and Melendi. Jesús Vázquez hosted the programme while Tania Llasera shared hosting duties as the social media correspondent. The first episode kicked off with 4,591,000 viewers (30.6% market share).

Step 1: « Audiciones a ciegas » (Blind Auditions) 
The Blind Auditions were taped in the third week of August 2012 and were aired from 19 September to 17 October 2012 in five telecasts. 80 auditioners took part in the Blind Auditions. Each coach had to form a team of 14 contestants.

Episode 1: 19 September 2012 
The first episode began with the four coaches singing "Viviendo deprisa".

Episode 2: 26 September 2012

Episode 3: 3 October 2012

Episode 4: 10 October 2012

Episode 5: 17 October 2012

Step 2: « Las Batallas » (The Battles) 
The Battle Round was taped in early October 2012 and was aired from 24 October to 7 November 2012 in three telecasts. Coaches begin narrowing down the playing field by training the contestants with the help of "trusted advisors". This round features twenty-eight battles consisting of pairings from within each team, and each battle concluding with the respective coach eliminating one of the two contestants. After the battles, each coach is left with seven contestants; each coach saves five of these to advance to the live shows, whereas the two remaining singers do a sing-off for the remaining live show spot. Thus, six contestants for each coach advance to the live shows.

The trusted advisors for these episodes are: Luis Fonsi working with David Bisbal, Antonio Carmona working with Rosario Flores, Tiziano Ferro working with Malú and Nek working with Melendi.

 – Battle Winner

Episode 6: 24 October 2012

Episode 7: 31 October 2012

Episode 8: 7 November 2012

Sing-off 
Each contestant that had to go through the sing-off performed the same song they had sung in the Blind Auditions.

 – Sing-off Winner

Step 3: « Los Directos » (Live Shows) 
Five Live Shows will be aired from 21 November to 19 December 2012. The first live show was scheduled for 14 November 2012, but it was postponed one week due to a general strike in Spain and replaced by a special best moments episode.

Public televoting begins at this point, with one candidate eliminated from each team in the first two live shows. Voting lines open during the broadcast of each live show. The first half of each team performs in the first Live Show, the second half in the second Live Show. In these first two shows, in each team, one contestant is automatically sent to the next round thanks to the votes of the audience, and the coach chooses one of the other two contestants to stay. After the first two shows, 16 singers remain (4 from each team) and perform in the third show; in each team one contestant is saved by the public and another one by the team's coach. In the semi-final, the 8 remaining contestants perform (2 from each team); one finalist is chosen for each team in a decision where both the team's coach and the public voting weight equally. In the final, public voting decides the winner between the 4 remaining contestants (one from each team).

Episode 9: 21 November 2012 
 Celebrity performer: Melendi with "Lágrimas desordenadas"

Competition performances

Non-competition performances

Episode 10: 28 November 2012 
 Celebrity performer: Malú and Aleks Syntek with "Sólo el amor nos salvará"

Competition performances

Non-competition performances

Episode 11: 5 December 2012 
Competition performances

Non-competition performances

Episode 12: 12 December 2012 (Semi-final) 
 Celebrity performers: Alejandro Sanz with "Mi marciana"; Leona Lewis with "Lovebird"; Rosario Flores and Lolita Flores with "A tu vera"; David Bisbal and Malú with "Doy la vida"

Competition performances

Non-competition performances

Episode 13: 19 December 2012 (Final) 
 Celebrity performers: Pablo Alborán with "El beso"; Rosario Flores and Antonio Carmona with "El sitio de mi recreo"

Solo performances

Duets with coach assistants

Duets with coaches

Group performances with celebrities

Ratings

References 

2012 Spanish television seasons
Spain